Banca Intesa Beograd is one of the largest operating banks in Serbia, majority owned (93%) by the Italian Intesa Sanpaolo and other 7% by International Financial Corporation, World Bank. Its headquarters is in Belgrade, Serbia.

History
It was founded as Delta banka in 1991. In February 2005, Banca Intesa acquired 75% stake in the bank for €278 million. By August of same year its stake was increased to 90%.

Following the majority takeover finalization, Delta banka officially changed its name to Banca Intesa Beograd during fall 2005. The bank has been trading on Belgrade Stock Exchange (BELEX) since 2006.

As a result of the August 2006 merger of Banca Intesa and Sanpaolo IMI banking groups, since 1 January 2007 Banca Intesa Beograd operated as member of the newly formed Intesa Sanpaolo group. Since Sanpaolo IMI owned Panonska banka in Serbia, a decision had to be made about the new group's future structure in Serbia. Initially, Banca Intesa Beograd and "Panonska banka" remained as separate entities. However, on 1 January 2008, "Panonska banka" has been merged into Banka Intesa Beograd.

See also
 List of banks in Serbia

References

External links
 

1991 establishments in Serbia
Banks of Serbia
Banks established in 1991
Companies based in Belgrade
Delta Holding
Intesa Sanpaolo subsidiaries